Applewood, or Applewood smoked cheddar, is a round, white smoke-flavoured Cheddar cheese that is manufactured by Norseland Limited (formerly Ilchester Cheese Company) in Somerset, England.

Character
Applewood smoked cheddar is a fairly dense semi-hard cheese. Applewood is not smoked, but is instead treated with an artificial smoke flavouring.  The cheese is coated with mild paprika, giving it a golden-amber appearance.  The cheese itself is rather soft in some cases, making it difficult to grate. The smoked flavour of the cheese does not leave a burnt aftertaste.

In 2019, Norseland Limited launched a vegan version of their Applewood cheese in collaboration with VBites in both pre-sliced packages and in blocks. It won the award for Best Vegan Cheese at the FreeFrom Food Awards in 2020.

Nutritional data (per oz.)
(Note: one ounce is about 28 grams)

References

External links
Norseland Homepage

English cheeses
Cow's-milk cheeses